The Ernest River is a river in the Kimberley region of Western Australia.

The headwaters of the river rise in the Drysdale River National Park at the foot of Tadarida Scarp. The river flows easterly until discharging into the Forrest River, of which it is a tributary.

The river was named by the Victoria Squatting Company surveyor Charles Burrowes.

References

Rivers of the Kimberley region of Western Australia